Rearrange Beds is the first studio album by the Australian indie rock band An Horse. It was released on 17 March 2009 by Mom + Pop Music and Valve Records in Australia. "Camp Out" is the first single, followed by "Postcards" as the second.

On 25 January 2019 Lame-O Records released the first vinyl pressing for the album's 10-year anniversary.

Track listing
"Camp Out"
"Postcards"
"Company"
"Horizons"
"Rearrange Beds"
"Little Little Little"
"Little Lungs"
"Scared As Fuck"
"Shoes Watch"
"Listen"

Personnel

An Horse
Kate Cooper - vocals, electric guitar, acoustic guitar
Damon Cox - drums, supporting vocals, melodica

Production
 Magoo - Producer
 Howard Redekopp - Mixer

References

External links
 An Horse official website
 
 Mom & Pop Music

2009 debut albums
An Horse albums
Mom + Pop Music albums